The 1994 Vermont gubernatorial election took place on November 7, 1994. Incumbent Governor Howard Dean won re-election.

Democratic primary

Candidates
 Howard Dean, incumbent Governor of Vermont

Results

Republican primary

Candidates
 David F. Kelley
 Thomas J. Morse
 John Gropper, businessman
 Gus Jaccacci

Results

Liberty Union primary

Candidates
 Richard F. Gottlieb

Results

General election

Results

References

1994
Vermont
Gubernatorial
Howard Dean